Frank Eugene Wade (1864 - April 10, 1929) was the president of the National Probation Association and in 1916 was appointed as the New York Superintendent of State Prisons.

Biography
He was born in 1864.  He married Blanche M. Lewis (1865-1922) and they had a daughter, Marion Wade (1888-1982). 

He became the New York Superintendent of State Prisons in 1916 when he replaced John B. Riley who was charged with misconduct in office.

He died on April 10, 1929 in Buffalo, New York.

References

1854 births
1929 deaths
New York Superintendents of State Prisons